This is the results breakdown of the local elections held in the Balearic Islands on 8 May 1983. The following tables show detailed results in the autonomous community's most populous municipalities, sorted alphabetically.

Overall

City control
The following table lists party control in the most populous municipalities, including provincial capitals (shown in bold). Gains for a party are displayed with the cell's background shaded in that party's colour.

Municipalities

Calviá

Ciutadella de Menorca
Population: 17,637

Ibiza
Population: 25,343

Inca
Population: 20,747

Llucmajor
Population: 14,556

Mahón
Population: 21,860

Manacor
Population: 24,208

Palma
Population: 290,372

Santa Eulalia del Río
Population: 13,060

See also
1983 Balearic regional election

References

Balearic Islands
1983